Tatjana Masurenko (born 21 January 1965) is a German violist of Russian descent.

Life 
Masurenko was born to a Russian family of scientists and jazz musicians. Born in Dushanbe, Tadjikistan, she grew up in Saint Petersburg, where she also started her studies which she then continued in Germany with Kim Kashkashian and Nobuko Imai. Encounters with Boris Pergamenschikow, György Kurtág and Brigitte Fassbaender formed her artistic development. Masurenko performs and records as a soloist with orchestras in concert halls all over Europe and Asia. She has played at Mozart Week Salzburg, Leipzig Bach Festival, Rheingau Musik Festival, Schubertiade Schwarzenberg, Musiktage Mondsee, Spannungen in Heimbach, Marlboro (USA), West Cork (Ireland) and Istanbul (Turkey). She has won the Lionel Tertis International Viola Competition, the Markneukirchen International Viola Competition and the Yuri Bashmet Competition. Her CD recordings "British Viola Concertos" (Coviello Classics) and of Karl Amadeus Hartmann's viola concerto (Capriccio) were awarded the German Record Critics’ Prize, the Diapason découverte and a Supersonic Award (Pizzicato). She has performed chamber music together with Heinrich Schiff, Gidon Kremer, Roglit Ishay, Steven Isserlis, Menahem Pressler, Lars Vogt, Isabelle Faust, Christian Tetzlaff, the Vogler Quartet as well as Carolin Widmann, Jörg Widmann and Jana Bouškova.

Since 2010, Masurenko has also been performing classical folklore in various programmes with ensembles such as the Volga Virtuoso Quartet (Russian folk instruments) and KOTTOS from Copenhague (international folklore with various flutes, guitar, cello and accordion).

Since 2018, she has intensively played the viola d’amore, developing her repertoire in the baroque, classic and modern styles for this instrument.

Masurenko has devoted herself to historically informed performance, particularly to the 19th century and the romantic repertoire. Inspired by Jesper Christensen’s ideas, she works with pianist Gilad Katznelson, also using historical sound documents, on questions concerning the interpretation of this music, the results of which were published on the CD "Just a motion on the air" in 2017.

Masurenko is the artistic director of the Iznik International Viola Camp in Turkey and the chamber music series "Viola plus" at the University of Music and Theater Leipzig. In 2008, she initiated an annual masterclass for viola in Leipzig, which she also directs. Masurenko was professor of viola at the Felix Mendelssohn Bartholdy University of Music and Theater in Leipzig from 2002 to 2022 and in the same position, teaches at the Haute Ecole de Musique de Lausanne in Sion, Switzerland since 2019. In June 2022, she was appointed to faculty by the Colburn School, Los Angeles. Many of her students have built successful careers and are internationally active as soloists, professors, solo violists in major orchestras and as chamber musicians. Her teaching method is based on the St Petersburg tradition of the 19th and early 20th centuries and merges with the new ideas and perceptions of the 20th and 21st centuries, especially regarding the interpretation of the baroque and classical periods.

She plays a viola by Paolo Antonio Testore, made in Milan in 1756, and an instrument specially built for her by Jürgen Manthey (Leipzig 2017), a luthier developing new acoustic and tonal designs. She also plays a viola d’amore by Charles Jacquot, Paris 1849. She uses different bows for different periods of music.

Premieres 
Tatjana Masurenko has premiered several works of contemporary music; the composers she works with include Moritz von Gagern, Dimitri Terzakis, Wolfgang Rihm, Spiros Mouchagier and Luca Lombardi.

 2015 Nejat Başeğmezler, "Meine kleine Bachmusik" for Viola, Strings and Harpsichord, with the Bratschistenfreunde Chamber Orchestra Leipzig
 2013–2015 Nejat Başeğmezler, various works for Viola ensembles, premiered by the Leipzig Viola Ensemble, directed by Tatjana Masurenko
 2012 Dimitri Terzakis, "Sonetto" for Viola and Piano
 2008 Wolfgang Rihm, "Doppelgesang" for Viola, Clarinet and Orchestra, German premiere with the Gewandhaus Orchestra and Jörg Widmann, directed by Axel Kober
 2007 Dimitri Terzakis, "Sappho" Cycle for Solo Viola
 2007 Moritz von Gagern, "Auffädeln", for Speaker and Viola (with Brigitte Fassbaender)
 2006 Spiros Mouchagier, "Greek Dances" for Viola and Piano
 2005 Dimitri Terzakis, "Visionen, die Schalen des Zorns betreffend" (2004) for Choir and Viola ad lib. World premiere: January 29, 2005, Leipzig, Thomaskirche, with the Thomanerchor
 2005 Spiros Mouchagier, "Terirem" for Viola and Chamber Orchestra
 2004 Johannes Dittmar, op. 8 für Viola Solo 
 2004 Dimitri Terzakis, "Hero und Leander" for Viola Solo
 2003 Dimitri Terzakis, "Solo für Tanja" for Viola Solo

Recordings 
 Just a Motion on the Air. Works for Viola and Piano by Ernst Krenek and Robert Schumann. Tatjana Masurenko (viola), Jens Elvekjær, Gilad Katznelson (piano). Coviello Classics, COV 91619
 White Nights, vol. 1. Viola Music from Saint Petersburg. Works by Dmitri Shostakovich, Mikhail Glinka, Alexander Glazunov, Igor Stravinsky, Nikolai Rimski-Korsakov and Pyotr Tchaikovsky. Tatjana Masurenko (viola), Roglit Ishay (piano). Hänssler PH10029
 White Nights, vol. 2. Viola Music from Saint Petersburg. Works by Sergei Prokofiev, Gennady Banshikov and Dmitri Shostakovich. Tatjana Masurenko (viola), Roglit Ishay (piano). Hänssler PH11070
 Karl Amadeus Hartmann, Concerto for Viola and Piano. Tatjana Masurenko (viola), Frank-Immo Zichner (piano). Rundfunk-Sinfonieorchester Berlin, conductor: Marek Janowski
 British Viola Concertos. William Walton, Concerto for Viola and Orchestra (1962 version, revised 2002); Sally Beamish, Concerto No. 1 for Viola and Orchestra (1995, revised 1998); Benjamin Britten, Lachrymae – Reflections on a song of Dowland, (1976 version for Viola and String Orchestra), Tatjana Masurenko (viola), NDR Radiophilharmonie, conductor: Garry Walker  
 Viola lumina. Johann Sebastian Bach, Suite No. 2 in D minor BWV 1008; Igor Stravinsky, Élégie (1944); [[Henri Vieuxtemps, Capriccio pour alto seule op. 61; Paul Hindemith, Sonata for Viola alone op.31 / 4 (1923) 
 Portrait of Tatjana Masurenko with Nina Kogan, piano: Johannes Brahms, Sonata in E flat major for Piano and Viola op. 120 No. 2; George Enescu, Concertstuck pour alto avec accompagnement de piano; Benjamin Britten, Lachrymae – Reflections on a song of Dowland for Viola and Piano op. 48; Darius Milhaud, Quatre Visages pour alto et piano; Paul Hindemith, Sonata op. 25 No. 1
 Dimitri Terzakis, Hero and Leander (2007). Christian Oliviera (narrator), Tatjana Masurenko (viola), Andrès Maupoint (piano)
 Wolfgang Amadeus Mozart, Figaro Suite for String Quartet with Jan Vogler and others (Sony)

References

1965 births
Living people
German classical violists
Women violists
German classical viola d'amore players
People from Dushanbe
Russian emigrants to Germany
20th-century German musicians
20th-century classical musicians
20th-century women musicians
21st-century German musicians
21st-century women musicians
21st-century classical musicians
20th-century violists
21st-century violists